The lateral rotator group is a group of six small muscles of the hip which all externally (laterally) rotate the femur in the hip joint. It consists of the following muscles: piriformis, gemellus superior, obturator internus, gemellus inferior, quadratus femoris and the obturator externus.

All muscles in the lateral rotator group originate from the hip bone and insert on to the upper extremity of the femur. The muscles are innervated by the sacral plexus (L4-S2), except the obturator externus muscle, which is innervated by the lumbar plexus.

Individual muscles

Other lateral rotators
This group does not include all muscles which aid in lateral rotation of the hip joint: rather it is a collection of ones which are known for primarily performing this action. Other muscles that contribute to lateral rotation of the hip include:
Gluteus maximus muscle (lower fibres)
Gluteus medius muscle and gluteus minimus muscle when the hip is flexed (become medial rotators when hip is extended)
Psoas major muscle
Psoas minor muscle
Sartorius muscle

Additional images

See also
Hip anatomy

References

External links

Hip lateral rotators
Muscles of the lower limb
Hip muscles
Deep lateral rotators of the hip